Michael Ellis (born 1984/1985) is an American attorney, Republican political operative, and former government official. He is a visiting fellow for law and technology with the Heritage Foundation's Meese Center for Legal and Judicial Studies. Ellis previously worked in multiple positions in the George W. Bush administration, for Republican congressman Devin Nunes and the Trump administration, being called a Donald Trump loyalist. He worked as a legal advisor to the National Security Council and was later appointed as Senior Director for Intelligence for the agency. In December 2021, he became the general counsel for the online video platform Rumble.
 
While on the NSC, Ellis was tasked with conducting a security review of a memoir by former Trump national security advisor John Bolton that sharply criticized Trump, resulting in Bolton being criminally charged. Ellis was appointed as the general counsel of the National Security Agency during the closing days of the Trump administration in 2020. NSA director Paul Nakasone opposed the appointment, but was ordered by acting defense secretary Christopher Miller to install Ellis to the position. Despite a preliminary finding by the Defense Department Inspector General that there was no improper influence on the appointment process, Nakasone placed Ellis on administrative leave on the first day of the Biden administration. Ellis resigned the following April, with an investigation later finding that there was no improper influence in his selection.

Early life and education
During high school, Ellis lived in the suburbs of Washington, D.C. He socialized with the journalist David Klion, with whom he often played the strategy board game Diplomacy.  At the age of 17, Ellis wrote an essay about the Battle of Caporetto. Ellis is an Eagle Scout.
 
Ellis attended Dartmouth College where he earned a Bachelor of Arts degree in 2006 and graduated summa cum laude. While at Dartmouth, he was the editor of the Dartmouth Review and a member of the Sigma Nu fraternity. He went on to attend Yale Law School where he earned a Juris Doctor in 2011. While at Yale, he was President of that school's chapter of the Federalist Society. In 2011 he was named as one of the Forbes 30 Under 30 for law and policy. He also served as an intelligence officer in the United States Navy Reserve.

Career

Early career in law and politics
While a freshman at Dartmouth, Ellis was a volunteer for the George W. Bush 2004 presidential campaign. After graduation he was hired by the administration to work as the associate director of the White House Office of Strategic Initiatives. He held the position from 2006 to 2007. From 2007–2008 he was the deputy director of strategy in Boston for Mitt Romney's presidential campaign. Ellis clerked for Judge Amul Thapar of the U.S. District Court for the Eastern District of Kentucky and Judge Jeffrey Sutton of the Sixth Circuit Court of Appeals, and later served as counsel to Mike Rogers from 2013 to 2015  and Devin Nunes and the Republican majority on the U.S. House Permanent Select Committee on Intelligence from 2015 to 2017. Ellis was one of the principal staffers who compiled the 2016 bipartisan House Intelligence Committee report on the Edward Snowden leaks, which was unanimously approved by the Committee.

2017 to present: National Security Council and NSA
In 2017, Ellis became the deputy legal advisor to the National Security Council (NSC) and the senior associate counsel to President Trump. The same year, The New York Times reported that Ellis was one of two officials who provided intelligence documents to Representative Devin Nunes, chair of the House Intelligence Committee, regarding the Trump Tower wiretapping allegations.
 
In March 2020, Ellis was appointed Senior Director for Intelligence on the NSC. The same year, he was assigned to further review the manuscript for The Room Where It Happened, a memoir written by former national security advisor John Bolton. The review was conducted from May 2 to June 9. It was later acknowledged that as many as half of the items Ellis had marked as classified may not have been so when Bolton wrote his manuscript, and Ellis's review was the first time that those items in the manuscript were flagged. NSA Director Nakasone agreed that the book contained classified information, and a federal judge later ruled that "Bolton likely published classified materials." Ellis was also investigated by the Defense Department inspector general regarding accusations that he retaliated against Eugene Vindman, the twin brother of Alexander Vindman who was a whistleblower in the Trump-Ukraine scandal.
 
In November 2020, Ellis was named general counsel of the National Security Agency (NSA) by the Pentagon general counsel after a civil service selection process. The position was within the federal civil service, which would allow Ellis to remain beyond the end of the Trump administration. He did not immediately assume the position, and NSA director Paul Nakasone opposed the appointment, and it was seen by some as a political appointee. Senators Mark Warner and Jack Reed requested that the Pentagon's acting inspector general conduct an investigation into the appointment.
 
Four days before Trump was set to leave office in January 2021, acting defense secretary Christopher Miller ordered the NSA to install Ellis by 6pm on January 16, 2021. NSA Director Nakasone did not honor Miller's request by the deadline, stating he had concerns over Ellis' qualifications. Nonetheless, on the required day, NSA announced that "Mr. Ellis accepted his final job offer yesterday afternoon." Nakasone placed Ellis on administrative leave on the first day of the Biden administration, pending completion of a Defense Department inspector general inquiry into the circumstances of his appointment, the preliminary findings of which found no improper political influence in the selection process. On April 16, 2021, Ellis resigned. The Inspector General later released findings saying there was no improper influence in Ellis' selection.
 
In May 2021, Ellis became a visiting fellow for law and technology with the Heritage Foundation's Meese Center for Legal and Judicial Studies. The Inspector General later released findings saying there was no improper influence in Ellis' selection.

Personal
Ellis married Katherine Racicot in 2011. In 2013, he appeared as a contestant on Jeopardy! and won with a final score of $16,400.

See also
John Eisenberg

References

 

1980s births
21st-century American lawyers
21st-century American politicians
Dartmouth College alumni
Jeopardy! contestants
Living people
National Security Agency people
Trump administration controversies
Trump administration personnel
United States National Security Council staffers
Washington, D.C., Republicans
Yale Law School alumni
Year of birth missing (living people)
Federalist Society members